Clube Desportivo e Recreativo Quarteirense,  commonly known as Quarteirense, is a Portuguese football club from Quarteira, in the Algarve region. The club was founded on 2 January 1937.

For the 2012–13 season, the team is currently competing in the Algarve regional Division, having gained promotion at the end of last season, after being 2nd in the F series of Terceira Divisão. Its home ground is the Estádio Municipal de Quarteira, which has a capacity of 2,300 seats.

Honours
AF Algarve First Division (2): 2006/07, 2010/11
AF Algarve Supercup (1): 2011/12

External links
Zerozero team profile
Foradejogo.net team profile

References

 
Football clubs in Portugal